Cold brew generally refers to:

 Cold brew coffee, which is steeped in cold or room temperature water
 Cold brew tea, similarly steeped in cold or room temperature water